Darjeeling railway station is a main railway station in Darjeeling district in the Indian state of West Bengal. The station lies on UNESCO World Heritage Site Darjeeling Himalayan Railway. It was allotted the railway code of DJ under the jurisdiction of Katihar railway division.

Trains 

Some of the trains that run from Darjeeling are:

 Darjeeling–Ghoom–Darjeeling JOY RIDE (Diesel)
 Darjeeling–Ghoom–Darjeeling JOY RIDE (Steam)
 Darjeeling–Ghoom–Darjeeling Joy Ride (Diesel)
 Darjeeling–Ghoom–Darjeeling Joyride (Diesel)
 Darjeeling–Kurseong NG Passenger
 Darjeeling–Kurseong NG Passenger
 Darjeeling–New Jalpaiguri Passenger
 Red Panda Express

References

Railway stations in Darjeeling district
Katihar railway division
Mountain railways in India
Transport in Darjeeling
Buildings and structures in Darjeeling